Baron Strange of Blackmere is an abeyant title in the Peerage of England. It was created on 13 January 1309 when Fulk le Strange was summoned to parliament. On the death of the fifth baron in 1375, it was inherited by Elizabeth Mowbray, née le Strange. On her death in the year 1383, it was inherited by Ankaret Talbot, née le Strange, daughter of the fourth Baron. On her son's death in 1419, the baron was inherited by Ankaret Talbot, his daughter. On her death in 1421, the barony was inherited by her uncle, John Talbot who was created Earl of Shrewsbury, Earl of Waterford and hereditary Lord High Steward of Ireland. On the death of the 7th earl in 1616, the barony fell into abeyance between his three daughters Mary, Elizabeth and Alethea. In 1651 Alethea became sole heir and therefore, Baroness Strange of Blackmere. The title continued in her descendants until the death of Edward Howard, 9th Duke of Norfolk and 22nd Baron Strange of Blackmere in 1777, when it again fell into abeyance. The co-heirs are the descendants of his nieces Winifred, Lady Stourton, and Ann, Lady Petre.

Barons Strange of Blackmere (1309)

Fulk le Strange, 1st Baron Strange of Blackmere (1267–1324)
John le Strange, 2nd Baron Strange of Blackmere (1305–1349)
Fulk le Strange, 3rd Baron Strange of Blackmere (1320–1349)
John le Strange, 4th Baron Strange of Blackmere (1332–1361)
John le Strange, 5th Baron Strange of Blackmere (1353–1375)
Elizabeth Mowbray, 6th Baroness Strange of Blackmere née le Strange (1373–1383)
Ankaret Talbot, 7th Baroness Strange of Blackmere née le Strange (1361–1413) (daughter of the 4th Baron Strange)
Gilbert Talbot, 5th Baron Talbot, 8th Baron Strange of Blackmere (1383–1419)
Ankaret Talbot, 6th Baroness Talbot, 9th Baroness Strange of Blackmere (1416–1421)
John Talbot, 1st Earl of Shrewsbury, 1st Earl of Waterford, 7th Baron Talbot, 10th Baron Strange of Blackmere (1390–1453) (second son of the 7th Baroness Strange) 
John Talbot, 2nd Earl of Shrewsbury, 2nd Earl of Waterford, 8th Baron Talbot, 11th Baron Strange of Blackmere, 7th Baron Furnivall (1413–1460)
John Talbot, 3rd Earl of Shrewsbury, 3rd Earl of Waterford, 9th Baron Talbot, 12th Baron Strange of Blackmere, 8th Baron Furnivall (1448–1473)
George Talbot, 4th Earl of Shrewsbury, 4th Earl of Waterford, 10th Baron Talbot, 13th Baron Strange of Blackmere, 9th Baron Furnivall (1468–1538)
Francis Talbot, 5th Earl of Shrewsbury, 5th Earl of Waterford, 11th Baron Talbot, 14th Baron Strange of Blackmere, 10th Baron Furnivall (1500–1560)
George Talbot, 6th Earl of Shrewsbury, 6th Earl of Waterford, 12th Baron Talbot, 15th Baron Strange of Blackmere, 11th Baron Furnivall (1522–1590)
Gilbert Talbot, 7th Earl of Shrewsbury, 7th Earl of Waterford, 13th Baron Talbot, 16th Baron Strange of Blackmere, 12th Baron Furnivall (1552–1616) (abeyant 1616)
Alethea Howard, Countess of Arundel, 14th Baroness Talbot, 17th Baroness Strange of Blackmere, 13th Baroness Furnivall née Talbot (1585–1654) (abeyance naturally terminated 1651)
Thomas Howard, 5th Duke of Norfolk, 18th Baron Strange of Blackmere (1627–1677)
Henry Howard, 6th Duke of Norfolk, 19th Baron Strange of Blackmere (1628–1684)
Henry Howard, 7th Duke of Norfolk, 20th Baron Strange of Blackmere (1655–1701)
Thomas Howard, 8th Duke of Norfolk, 21st Baron Strange of Blackmere (1683–1732)
Edward Howard, 9th Duke of Norfolk, 22nd Baron Strange of Blackmere (1686–1777)
abeyant since 1777

References
 Patrick Cracroft-Brennan, Strange of Blackmere, Baron (E, 1309 - abeyant 1777) in Cracroft's Peerage. Accessed 11 August 2013.

 
1309 establishments in England
Abeyant baronies in the Peerage of England
Noble titles created in 1309
Le Strange family